Ringo Starr and His Third All-Starr Band, Volume 1 is a limited edition live album by Ringo Starr and his All-Starr Band, recorded at the Nippon Budokan in Tokyo, Japan. It was released on 12 August 1997 by Blockbuster for only $5.99. The All-Starr Band included the return of the keyboardist Billy Preston and Starr's son Zak.

Track listing

Personnel 
Ringo Starr and His All-Starr Band
Ringo Starr – drums, percussion, vocals
Randy Bachman – guitars, vocals
Mark Farner – guitars, vocals
Billy Preston – keyboards, vocals
Felix Cavaliere – keyboards, vocals
John Entwistle – bass, vocals
Mark Rivera – saxophone, percussion, guitar, backing vocals
Zak Starkey – drums, percussion

References
Footnotes

Citations

1997 live albums
Ringo Starr live albums
Albums produced by Ringo Starr
Ringo Starr & His All-Starr Band